The Williams Ephs are the varsity intercollegiate athletic programs of Williams College in Williamstown, Massachusetts.

The school sponsors 32 varsity sports, most of which compete in the Division III New England Small College Athletic Conference (NESCAC). The school's men's and women's ski teams and men's and women's squash teams compete in Division I. The Ephs' nickname (which rhymes with "chiefs") is a shortened form of the name of Ephraim Williams, the college's founder. The Ephs' mascot is a purple cow, and their colors are purple and gold. The school's athletic director is Lisa Melendy.

Williams, along with fellow NESCAC members Amherst and Wesleyan, is part of the Little Three rivalry, one of the oldest continually contested rivalries in college athletics. It dates to 1899, when the three schools formed the Triangular League for athletic competitions. Today, the majority of the three schools' sports contest the Little Three championship, in which the school with the best record in games among the three is awarded the Little Three title for its sport. Williams's rivalry with Amherst is particularly heated, dating back to 1821, when then-Williams president Zephaniah Swift Moore abandoned Williams to found Amherst College. The football game played between the two is known as the "Biggest Little Game in America" and hosted College GameDay in 2007.

Williams has consistently won the NACDA Directors' Cup, an annual award for the most successful athletic program in each NCAA division. Since 1996, the year of the award's inception, Williams has won the Division III Directors' Cup 22 out of 24 years (the exceptions being 1998 and 2012). For sixteen of the past seventeen years (2004–2011, 2013-2020), the college has held a dual #1 ranking in both athletics and academics by winning the Directors' Cup and placing first in the U.S. News & World Report liberal arts college rankings. Alumni of the athletic program include two Nobel Prize winners, 33 Olympians, 19 Rhodes Scholars, four Marshall Scholars, and 44 Fulbright Scholars.

History
Varsity intercollegiate sports began at the school on July 1, 1859, when Williams was defeated by Amherst 73-32 in the first-ever college baseball game. On May 3, 2009, Williams's baseball team played Amherst at Wahconah Park in Pittsfield, Massachusetts to commemorate the 150th anniversary of the 1859 game. Williams won the game, 8-5, which was televised live on ESPN 360 and on tape delay on ESPNU.

Williams was one of the 39 institutions that founded the National Collegiate Athletic Association (NCAA) in 1905. Three other NESCAC schools, Amherst, Tufts, and Wesleyan, were also part of the founding group.

Women's varsity athletics began at Williams after the college became coeducational in the 1970–1971 school year. As a result, most of the college's 16 women's sports programs began varsity play during the 1970s, with three exceptions (softball in 1987, ice hockey in 1993, and golf in 2004–2005).

National championships
From the formation of the NCAA through 1961, Williams allowed its teams to compete in the NCAA postseason. In 1961, the men's basketball program qualified for the College Division tournament. After defeating Rochester (NY) in the first round and Bates in the regional championship, the team advanced to the national quarterfinals against Wittenberg. Williams lost the game, 64-51, and the unruly celebrations of Wittenberg students led Williams administrators to decide the school should no longer compete in national tournaments. When the NESCAC formed in 1971, the league's other ten members adopted Williams's policy. Despite this ban, the women's swimming & diving team won the 1982 and 1983 national championships by qualifying enough individuals to outscore all other teams. The ban was lifted for the 1993–1994 academic year for all sports except football.

The following is a list of Williams's 37 national championships. Williams's total is tied for the most in the NESCAC with Middlebury.

Teams

Men's

Baseball
The baseball team is coached by Bill Barrale, who has held the position since the start of the 2007 season. The team plays at Bobby Coombs Field on campus. The program has had four players selected to the Division III All-America Team since 1971. In rivalry play against Amherst (beginning in 1859), the team holds a 139–217–2 record, as of the end of the 2018 season. In games against Wesleyan (beginning in 1892), the team holds a 158–134–1 record, as of the end of the 2018 season.

On July 1, 1859, the team played in the first-ever college baseball game, losing to Amherst 73–32 in a game that lasted 25 innings. The two teams played a game on May 3, 2009, to celebrate the first game's 150th anniversary. Williams won the game 8-5.

Six Williams alumni who played baseball for the program went on to play in the major leagues: Artie Clarke, Edward M. Lewis, Jack Mills, Bill Otis, Iron Davis, and Mark Filley. Three others who played for the program but did not graduate from Williams also played in the major leagues: Henry Clarke, Alex Burr, and Charlie Perkins.

The team has won the following honors:
Little Three Titles (since 1990): 1997, 1998, 2001, 2004, 2006, 2007, 2010
NESCAC Championships: 2001, 2007
NCAA Tournament Appearances: 1999, 2001, 2007

Basketball
The men's basketball team is coached by Kevin App, who has held the position since the start of the 2014–15 season. The team plays at Chandler Gymnasium on campus. The program holds the record for the longest home win streak in men's Division III history, having won 64 consecutive games at Chandler Gymnasium from January 16, 2001, to January 4, 2005. The team has had 14 players named to the Division III All-America Team since 1971, including three two-time and two three-time selections. The individual honorees include Harry Sheehy III (1974, 1975), Garcia Major (1990), Rob Bice (1994), Noah Clarke (1995), Geoff Chapin (1996), Michael Nogelo (1996, 1997, 1998), Matt Hunt (1999), Ben Coffin (2004), Michael Crotty (2003, 2004), Blake Schultz (2010), Troy Whittington (2011), James Wang (2010, 2011), Michael Mayer (2013, 2014), Duncan Robinson (2014), and James Heskett (2018). The team has also had two players named National Players of the Year, Michael Nogelo in 1998 and Blake Schultz in 2010.

Basketball was first recognized as a varsity sport in the 1900–01 season. Williams was retroactively recognized as the pre-NCAA Tournament national champion for the 1906–07 and 1909–10 seasons by the Premo-Porretta Power Poll. In rivalry play against Amherst (beginning in 1901), the team holds a 120–102 record, as of the end of the 2017–18 season. In games against Wesleyan (beginning in 1902), the team holds a 141–86 record, as of the end of the 2017–18 season. In 2003, the team won the Division III National Championship.

The team reached the quarterfinals of the 1961 College Division Tournament, where it lost to Wittenberg 64-51. As a result of Wittenberg students' unruly celebrations after the game, Williams administrators decided to ban teams from participating in national tournaments. The ban was lifted for the 1993–94 academic year.

For the 2012–13 season, the team ranked 26th in Division III in average game attendance, averaging 825 spectators per home game.

The team has won the following honors:
Little Three Titles (since 1990): 1990, 1992, 1993, 1995, 1996, 2009, 2010 (outright); 1994, 1997, 1998, 2000, 2002–2004, 2011 (ties)
NESCAC Championships: 2003, 2004, 2007, 2010, 2018
NCAA Tournament Appearances: 1994–1998, 2000, 2002–2004, 2007, 2010, 2011, 2013, 2014, 2017, 2018, 2019
Final Fours: 1997, 1998, 2003, 2004, 2010, 2011, 2014, 2017
National Runners-up: 2004, 2010, 2014
National Championships: 2003

Crew
The men's crew team is coached by Marc Mandel, who has held the position since the start of the 2017–18 season. The team rows on Lake Onota in Pittsfield, Massachusetts, approximately 30 minutes from campus. The program began varsity competition in 1869 but withdrew in 1879. It was brought back for a short time in the 1930s until the start of World War II. In 1968, Williams alumnus John A. Shaw revived the team, which has competed continually since then. The program has had one alumnus go on to compete in the Olympics.

The team has won the following honors:
Little Three Titles (since 1990): 1992, 1994–1998, 2000–2006, 2008–2016, 2018, 2021, 2022
NESCAC Championships: 2004, 2009–2014, 2016, 2021, 2022
ECAC National Invitational Championships: 2010, 2012–2014
Head of the Charles Collegiate Eights Championships: 1997, 2008, 2009, 2011
New England Championships: 1994–1996, 2009–2012, 2014, 2022
IRA Division 3 National Championship: 2022

Cross country
The men's cross country team is coached by Peter Farwell, who has held the position since the start of the 1979 season. The team's home course is located near Mount Greylock High School in Williamstown, approximately five minutes from campus. The team has had numerous runners named to the Division III All-America Team and two individual national champions (Jeremie Perry in 1994 and Neal Holtschulte in 2005) since beginning varsity competition in 1912.

The team has won the following honors:
Little Three Titles (since 1988): 1988–2016, 2019-2021
NESCAC Championships: 1992, 1994–2000, 2006–2009, 2011, 2013–2016, 2019
NCAA Tournament Appearances: 1975, 1977, 1993–2004, 2006–2018
NCAA Tournament 5th Place: 1996, 2000, 2013
NCAA Tournament 4th Place: 1993
NCAA Tournament 3rd Place: 1998, 2008, 2019
National Runners-up: 2009, 2015
National Champions: 1994, 1995

Football

The football team is coached by Mark Raymond, who has held the position since the start of the 2016 season. The team plays at Weston Field on campus. The team has had 16 players named to the Division III All-America Team since 1974. The program began varsity play in 1881. As a NESCAC football team, the program is not permitted to play non-conference games or to participate in the NCAA Tournament.

The team's annual rivalry game against Amherst is known as the Biggest Little Game In America. It is traditionally the final game of each season. The 2007 game between Williams and Amherst, won by Williams 20–0, hosted College GameDay at Weston Field (Williamstown). As of the end of the 2013 season, Williams leads the all-time series 71–52–5.

The team has won the following honors:
Little Three Titles (since 1990): 1990–1994, 1996, 1998, 2001, 2003, 2005–2008, 2010 (outright); 1995, 1997, 1999 (ties)
NESCAC Championships (since 2000): 2001, 2006, 2010 (outright); 2002 (tie)
Perfect seasons (8-0): 1989, 1990, 1994, 1998, 2001, 2006, 2010

Golf
The men's golf team is currently coached by Josh Hillman, who has held the position since the start of the start of the 2013 spring season. The team plays at the Taconic Golf Club in Williamstown, located next to campus. The program has had eight players, including one two-time selection, named to the Division III All-America Team since varsity competition began in 1903.

The team has won the following honors:
Little Three Titles (since 1990): 1992, 1993, 1995, 1998–2011, 2013–2016
NESCAC Championships: 1984, 1986, 1994, 1996, 2000–2002, 2004, 2005, 2008, 2013–2016
NCAA Tournament appearances: 1996–2003, 2005, 2008, 2013, 2017
NCAA Tournament individual champion: Sam Goldenring (2019)

Ice hockey
The men's ice hockey team is coached by Bill Kangas, who has held the position since the start of the 1989–1990 season. The team plays at Lansing Chapman Rink on campus. Prior to the construction of Lansing Chapman in the 1950s, the team played outdoors on a pond near the current location of Cole Field, the Williams soccer facility. The program has had seven players, including one two-time and one three-time selection, named to the Division III All-America Team since varsity play began in 1902. In rivalry play against Amherst (beginning in 1909), the team holds an 89–36–3 record, as of the end of the 2013–2014 season. In games against Wesleyan (beginning in 1958), the team holds a 40–6–7 record, as of the end of the 2013–2014 season.

The program has won the following honors:
Little Three Titles (since 1989): 1990–1994, 1996–1999, 2001–2005, 2013 (outright); 1989, 2006 (ties)

Indoor track & field
The men's indoor track & field team is coached by David Thompson, who has held the position since the start of the 2013–2014 season. The team competes at the Towne Field House on campus. It has had numerous athletes named to the Division III All-America Team since varsity play began. The indoor program does not compete in either the Little Three Meet (held in the spring) or the NESCAC Championships (sponsored only in the outdoor season). Thus, the team's postseason play consists only of regionals and nationals. It has had three individual national champions: Bobby Walker in the 35 lb. Weight Throw in 1995, Ethan Brooks in the 35 lb. Weight Throw in 1996, and Creaghan Trainor in the 800 Meter in 1996.

The team has won the following honors:
NCAA Championships 3rd Place: 1996

Lacrosse
The men's lacrosse team is coached by George McCormack, who has held the position since the start of the 2004 season. The team plays at Renzie Lamb Field on campus. The program has had numerous players named to the Division III All-America Team since varsity play began in 1928. In rivalry play against Amherst (beginning in 1955), the team holds a 36–26 record, as of the end of the 2014 season. In games against Wesleyan (beginning in 1960), the team holds a 38–19 record, as of the end of the 2014 season.

The program has won the following honors:
Little Three Titles (since 1990): 1990–1996, 1999, 2009 (outright); 2000, 2002, 2006, 2008, 2010 (ties)

Outdoor track & field
The men's outdoor track & field team is coached by David Thompson, who has held the position since the start of the 2014 season.  The team competes at the Tony Plansky Track on campus. It has had numerous athletes named to the Division III All-America Team since varsity play began in 1884. It has had nine individual national champions.

The team has won the following honors:
Little Three Titles (since 1989): 1989–2014
NESCAC Championships: 1995–1999, 2001–2011
National Runners-up: 1995, 1996

Skiing
The men's Nordic ski team is coached by Jason Lemieux, who has held the position since the 2014–2015 season. The men's alpine ski team is coached by Kelsey Levine, who has held the position since the 2014–2015 season. The Nordic ski team competes at Prospect Mountain in Woodford, Vermont, approximately 30 minutes from campus. The alpine ski team competes at Jiminy Peak in Hancock, Massachusetts, approximately 20 minutes from campus. The teams have had numerous skiers named to the Division I All-America Team since varsity competition began in 1974.

The team has won the following honors:
NCAA Tournament Appearances: 1990–2016

Soccer
The men's soccer team is coached by Mike Russo, who has held the position since the start of the 1979 season and been named National Coach of the Year four times. The team plays at Cole Field on campus. The team has had numerous players named to the Division III All-America Team, including four named National Players of the Year, since varsity play began in 1922. In rivalry play against Amherst (beginning in 1922), the team holds a 40–45–14 record, as of the end of the 2013 season. In games against Wesleyan (beginning in 1924), the team holds a 53–32–11 record, as of the end of the 2013 season. The team won the 1995 National Championship.

The team has had 13 players go on to play professional and international soccer, including Mike Masters, Stephen Danbusky, Dan Calichman, Josh Bolton, Charlie Romero, and Khari Stephenson.

The team has won the following honors:
Little Three Titles (since 1990): 1993, 1994, 1996, 1998–2001, 2003–2005, 2009 (outright); 1990, 1995, 1997, 2002, 2010, 2012 (ties)
NESCAC Championships: 2001–2004, 2006, 2009
NCAA Tournament Appearances: 1993–1996, 1998–2007, 2009, 2010, 2012–13
NCAA Third Place: 1998, 2009, 2012, 2013
National Runners-up: 1993
National Championships: 1995

Squash
The men's squash team is coached by Zafi Levy, who has held the position since the start of the 2002–2003 season. The team plays at the Simon Squash Center on campus. The team has had numerous players named to the Division I All-America Team since varsity play began in 1939. In rivalry play against Amherst (beginning in 1940), the team holds a 54–21 record, as of the end of the 2013–2014 season. In matches against Wesleyan (beginning in 1939), the team holds a 69–0 record, as of the end of the 2013–2014 season.

The team has won the following honors:
Little Three Titles (since 1990): 1990, 1991, 1993, 1994, 2000–2014
Appearances in Potter Division (Top 8 Teams) at National Championships: 1997, 1998, 1999, 2001, 2002, 2006, 2007, 2008

Swimming & diving
The men's swimming & diving team is coached by Steve Kuster, who has held the position since the start of the 1999–2000 season. The team competes at Samuelson-Muir Pool on campus. The team has had numerous swimmers named to the Division III All-America Team since varsity competition began in 1907–1908. In rivalry meets against Amherst (beginning in 1909), the team holds a 68–34–2 record, as of the end of the 2013–2014 season. In meets against Wesleyan (beginning in 1916), the team holds a 73–15–1 record, as of the end of the 2013–2014 season. The team has won 16 individual and one relay national championship.

The team has won the following honors:
Little Three Titles (since 1990): 1990–1993, 1995–2002, 2005, 2006, 2010, 2013
NESCAC Championships: 2001, 2003–2014
NCAA Tournament Appearances: 1982–2014
National Runners-up: 1982

Tennis
The men's tennis team is coached by Dan Greenberg, who has held the position since the start of the 2010 season. The team plays at the Torrence M. Hunt Tennis Center on campus. It also has four indoor courts in Lansing Chapman Rink. The team has had numerous players named to the Division III All-America Team since varsity play began in 1884, including one National Player of the Year (Josh Lefkowitz in 2002). In rivalry play against Amherst (beginning in 1899), the team holds a 71–36–3 record, as of the end of the 2014 season. In matches against Wesleyan (beginning in 1910), it holds an 87–4–3 record, as of the end of the 2014 season. The team has won four national championships, in 1999, 2001, 2002, and 2013.

The team has won the following honors:
Little Three Titles (since 1990): 1995–2008
NESCAC Championships: 1983, 1985, 1987, 1993–2003, 2013
NCAA Tournament Appearances: 1995–2014
NCAA Third Place: 2012
National Runners-up: 1998, 2003, 2004
National Championships: 1999, 2001, 2002, 2013

Wrestling
The men's wrestling team is coached by head coach Scott Honecker, who was named to the position prior to the 2013–2014 season, having served as interim head coach for the 2012–2013 season. Historically, the team competed for the Little Three Championship, but the Little Three Meet was discontinued in 1991. The team has had eight wrestlers named to the Division III All-America Team, including one two-time and three three-time selections, since varsity play began in 1925.

The team has won the following honors:
Little Three Championships (since 1990): 1990
NECCWA Co-Championships: 1995
NEWA Championships: 2009, 2010
NCAA Tournament Appearances: 2000, 2003–2009, 2013–2014

Women's

Basketball
The women's basketball team is coached by Pat Manning, who has held the position since the start of the 1989–1990 season and is the winningest coach in program history. The team plays at Chandler Gymnasium on campus. It has had three players named to the Division III All-America Team since 1974. The team began varsity play in the 1973–1974 school year. In rivalry play against Amherst (beginning in 1977), the team holds a 44–35 record, as of the end of the 2013–2014 season. In games against Wesleyan (beginning in 1974), the team holds a 54–26 record, as of the end of the 2013–2014 season.

The team has won the following honors:
Little Three Titles (since 1990): 1991, 1996, 1997, 1999, 2002, 2007 (outright); 1994, 1995, 1998, 2003–2006, 2013 (ties)
NCAA Tournament Appearances: 1997, 1999, 2006, 2007, 2010, 2011, 2013, 2014
NCAA Tournament Third Place: 2013

Crew
The women's crew team is coached by Kate Maloney, who has held the position since the start of the 2012 season. The team rows on Lake Onota in Pittsfield, Massachusetts, approximately 30 minutes from campus. The team has had numerous players named to the Division III All-America Team since it began varsity competition in the 1977–1978 school year. The program has had three alumni go on to compete in the Olympics. As of the end of the 2013 season, the program has won eight consecutive national championships, a women's Division III record.

The team has won the following honors:
Little Three Titles (since 1990): 1990, 1991, 1993, 1994, 1995, 1997, 1998, 2000–2014
NESCAC Championships: 2002, 2006–2013
ECAC National Invitational Championships: 2002, 2006–2013
Head of the Charles Collegiate Eights Championships: 2008, 2010, 2011
New England Championships: 2000, 2001, 2006–2013
NCAA Tournament Appearances: 1998–2014
National Championships: 2002, 2006–2013

Cross country
The women's cross country team is coached by Peter Farwell, who has held the position since the start of the 2000 season. The team's home course is located near Mount Greylock High School in Williamstown, approximately five minutes from campus. The team has had numerous runners named to the Division III All-America Team and two individual national champions (Jessica Caley in 1995 and Chiara del Piccolo in 2011) since beginning varsity competition in 1976.

The team has won the following honors:
Little Three Titles (since 1990): 1990–1998, 2000–2002, 2004–2006, 2008–2013
NESCAC Championships: 1988–1991, 1996, 1997, 2002, 2005, 2011, 2012 (outright); 2004, 2008 (ties)
NCAA Tournament Appearances: 1990, 1993–2013
NCAA Tournament 5th Place: 1993, 1996, 2010
NCAA Tournament 4th Place: 1994, 2003, 2012
NCAA Tournament 3rd Place: 1990, 1998, 2008, 2011
National Runners-up: 2000, 2001, 2005, 2013
National Champions: 2002, 2004, 2015

Field hockey
The women's field hockey team is coached by Alix Barrale, who has held the position since the start of the 2000 season. The team plays at Renzie Lamb Field on campus. The program has had numerous players named to the Division III All-America Team since 1989. It began varsity play in the 1972 season. In rivalry play against Amherst (beginning in 1977), the team holds a 27–14–1 record, as of the end of the 2013 season. In games against Wesleyan (beginning in 1974), the team holds of 34–8 record, as of the end of the 2013 season.

The team has won the following honors:
Little Three Titles (since 1990): 1991, 1992, 1994–1996, 2001, 2004, 2006, 2009 (outright); 1990, 1993, 1997, 1999, 2002 (ties)
NESCAC Championships: 2001, 2002, 2004
NCAA Tournament Appearances: 1994–1997, 2000–2006

Golf
The women's golf team has been coached by Tomas Adalsteinsson since 2016. Adalsteinsson replaced coach Bill Kangas, who was serving as interim head coach for the 2014–2015 season after Eika DeSanty left to become the head coach at Princeton. The team plays at the Taconic Golf Club in Williamstown, located next to campus. The program began varsity play in the 2004–2005 season.  In 2014, the Ephs' Georgiana Salant won the individual national championship. In 2015, Ephs' Womens Golf won their first Team National Championship, led by sophomore, Sophie Kitchen, who finished third individually.

The team has won the following honors:
NESCAC Championships: 2007, 2008, 2011–2019
NCAA Tournament appearances: 2007, 2008, 2010–2019
National Champions: 2015
NCAA Tournament individual champion: Cordelia Chan (2019)

Ice hockey
The women's ice hockey team is coached by Meghan Gillis, who has held the position since the start of the 2011–2012 season. The team plays at Lansing Chapman Rink on campus. The program has had three players named to the Division III All-America Team since the beginning of varsity play in the 1993–1994 season. One of the program's All-Americans, Molly Wasserman, was a four-time selection (2001, 2002, 2003, 2004), who was also named the Division III National Player of the Year in 2004. In rivalry play against Amherst (beginning in 1994), the team holds a 24–15–2 record, as of the end of the 2013–2014 season. In games against Wesleyan (beginning in 1994), the team holds a 29–11–4 record, as of the end of the 2013–2014 season.

The team has won the following honors:
Little Three Titles (since 1995): 1995, 1997, 2000–2006, 2017 (outright); 1994, 1996 (ties)
NESCAC Championships: 2014
NCAA Tournament Appearances: 2003, 2014

Indoor track & field
The women's indoor track & field team is coached by Nate Hoey, who has held the position since the start of the 2013–2014 season. The team competes at the Towne Field House on campus. It has had numerous athletes named to the Division III All-America Team since varsity play began. The indoor program does not compete in either the Little Three Meet (held in the spring) or the NESCAC Championships (sponsored only in the outdoor season). Thus, the team's postseason play consists only of regionals and nationals. It has had one relay and seven individual national champions and also won the team National Championship in 2007.

The team has won the following honors:
National Runners-up: 2006
National Championships: 2007, 2019

Lacrosse
The women's lacrosse team is coached by Alice Lee. The team plays at Renzie Lamb Field on campus. The program has had numerous players named to the Division III All-America Team since varsity play began in 1974. It has also had one National Defensive Player of the Year (Alyse Clayman in 1996) and one National Offensive Player of the Year (Alana Teutonico in 1997). In rivalry play against Amherst (beginning in 1978), the team holds a 22–19 record, as of the end of the 2014 season. In games against Wesleyan (beginning in 1978), the team holds a 31–6 record, as of the end of the 2014 season.

The team has won the following honors:
Little Three Titles (since 1990): 1990–1997, 2000, 2010 (outright); 1999, 2009 (ties)
NCAA Tournament Appearances: 1998, 2000, 2003, 2009, 2010, 2014
National Runners-up: 1998, 2000

Outdoor track & field
The women's outdoor track & field team is coached by Nate Hoey, who has held the position since the start of the 2014 season. The team competes at the Tony Plansky Track on campus. It has had numerous athletes named to the Division III All-America Team since varsity play began in 1977. It has had thirteen individual national champions.

The team has won the following honors:
Little Three Titles (since 1986): 1986–2013
NESCAC Championships: 1990, 1991, 1994–1999, 2001–2012

Skiing
The women's Nordic ski team is coached by Jason Lemieux, who has held the position since the 2014–2015 season. The women's alpine ski team is coached by Kelsey Levine, who has held the position since the 2014–2015 season. The Nordic ski team competes at Prospect Mountain in Woodford, Vermont, approximately 30 minutes from campus. The alpine ski team competes at Jiminy Peak in Hancock, Massachusetts, approximately 20 minutes from campus. The teams have had numerous skiers named to the Division I All-America Team since varsity competition began in 1974.

The team has won the following honors:
NCAA Tournament Appearances: 1990–2014

Soccer
The women's soccer team is coached by Michelyne Pinard, who has held the position since the start of the 2002 season. The team plays at Cole Field on campus. The team has had numerous players named to the Division III All-America Team since varsity play began in 1978. In rivalry play against Amherst (beginning in 1979), the team holds a 16-16-9 record, as of the end of the 2013 season. In games against Wesleyan (beginning in 1978), the team holds a 33–4–2 record, as of the end of the 2013 season.

The team has won the following honors:
Little Three Titles (since 1990): 1991, 1993, 1998, 2001, 2007, 2009, 2012, 2013 (outright); 1990, 1995, 1996, 1999, 2002, 2008 (ties)
NESCAC Championships: 2004, 2007–2010, 2012
NCAA Tournament Appearances: 1993–1996, 1998, 1999, 2001, 2004, 2007–2015
National Champions: 2015
National Runners-up: 2014
Final Four Appearances: 1999, 2008

Softball
The softball team is coached by Kris Herman, who has held the position since the 2004 season. The team plays at the Williams Softball Complex on campus. The program has had four players named to the Division III All-America Team since varsity play began in 1987. In rivalry play against Amherst (beginning in 1987), the team holds a 36–14 record, as of the end of the 2014 season. In games against Wesleyan (beginning in 1987), the team holds a 48–14 record, as of the end of the 2014 season.

The team has won the following honors:
Little Three Titles (since 1990): 1995–1997, 1999–2007, 2009, 2010, 2012, 2014
NESCAC Championships: 2004–2006
NCAA Tournament Appearances: 2004–2006, 2014
Division III World Series Appearances: 2005, 2006

Squash
The women's squash team is coached by Zafi Levy, who has held the position since the start of the 2002–2003 season. The team plays at the Simon Squash Center on campus. The program has had numerous players named to the Division III All-America Team since varsity play began in the 1974–1975 season. In rivalry play against Amherst (beginning in 1979), the team holds a 31–8 record, as of the end of the 2013–2014 season. In matches against Wesleyan (beginning in 1975), the team holds a 43–1 record, as of the end of the 2013–2014 season.

The team has won the following honors:
Little Three Titles (since 1990): 1991, 1993–1995, 2000–2014
Howe Cup Appearances: 1998, 2002–2007, 2009

Swimming & diving
The women's swimming & diving team is coached by Steve Kuster, who has held the position since the start of the 1999–2000 season. The team competes at Samuelson-Muir Pool on campus. The team has had numerous swimmers named to the Division III All-America Team since varsity competition began in 1977–1978. In rivalry meets against Amherst (beginning in 1977), the team holds a 34–4 record, as of the end of the 2013–2014 season. In meets against Wesleyan (beginning in 1978), the team holds a 35–0 record, as of the end of the 2013–2014 season. It has won every NESCAC Championship since the conference began holding a women's swimming & diving championship in 2001. The team has won 69 individual and 21 relay national championships.  Additionally, despite the NESCAC's ban on member schools' competition in national team championships, the program qualified enough swimmers individually to win the 1982 and 1983 National Championships.  Kuwaiti Olympian Faye Sultan, who began competing for the team in the 2012–2013 season, is the team's first swimmer to compete in Olympic competition.

The team has won the following honors:
Little Three Titles (since 1990): 1990–2003, 2005, 2006, 2009–2013
NESCAC Championships: 2001–2012
NCAA Tournament Appearances: 1982–2013
National Runners-up: 1995, 1997, 2003, 2012
National Championships: 1982, 1983

Tennis
The women's tennis team is coached by Alison Swain, who has held the position since the start of the 2008 season. The team plays at the Torrence M. Hunt Tennis Center on campus. It also has four indoor courts in Lansing Chapman Rink. It has had numerous players named to the Division III All-America Team since varsity play began in 1973. In rivalry play against Amherst (beginning in 1977), the team holds a 29–39 record, as of the end of the 2014 season. In matches against Wesleyan (beginning in 1972), the team holds a 40–0 record, as of the end of the 2014 season. The team has won eight National Championships (a women's Division III record), in 2001, 2002, 2008, 2009, 2010, 2011, 2012, and 2013. It also has won two National Doubles Championships (the teams of Julie Greenwood and Becky Mallory in 1994 and Julie Greenwood and Porter Harris in 1996).

The team has won the following honors:
Little Three Titles (since 1990): 1992–1995, 2000, 2002, 2006, 2008, 2010, 2012
NESCAC Championships: 2001, 2002, 2003, 2011, 2013 (outright); 2004 (tie)
NCAA Tournament Appearances: 1994–2014
NCAA Tournament 3rd Place: 2003, 2004, 2014
National Runners-up: 1994, 1999
National Championships: 2001, 2002, 2008–2013

Volleyball
The women's volleyball team is coached by Christi Kelsey, who has held the position since the start of the 2009 season. The team plays at Chandler Gymnasium on campus. It has had numerous players named to the Division III All-America Team since varsity play began in 1976. In rivalry play against Amherst (beginning in 1979), the team holds a 45–27 record, as of the end of the 2013 season.  Against Wesleyan (beginning in 1983), the team holds a 35-7 record.

The team has won the following honors:
Little Three Titles (since 1990): 1990, 1995–1998, 2001–2004, 2006, 2013 (outright); 2009 (ties)
NESCAC Championships: 1994, 1995, 2001–2004, 2007–2009, 2013
NCAA Tournament Appearances: 1994, 1995, 1998, 2001–2004, 2007–2009, 2013

Facilities
Most Williams's athletic programs have on-campus home venues, with the exceptions of men's and women's cross country, men's and women's golf, men's and women's crew, and men's and women's skiing.

Weston Field

Weston Field is the home of Williams's football team. The field hosted its first football game in November 1883. It has a seated capacity of 10,000 spectators, with additional standing room. In November 1989, the Division III New England football single-game attendance record was set at Weston, when 13,671 spectators attended Williams's 17–14 victory over Amherst. In 2007, the field hosted College GameDay.

The field has undergone several renovations since its opening. In 1953, a press box was added and later upgraded in 1984. The field's bleacher seating areas have been renovated in 1972, 1984, and 1995. An electronic scoreboard was added in 1969. A play clock was installed in 1998. In 2008, the field was scheduled to undergo $17.6 million renovations, in which the playing surface would be reoriented and the locker rooms, training areas, seating areas, and parking lots improved, but those renovations were indefinitely postponed due to the onset of the financial crisis.  In October 2012, however, a new, $22 million renovation plan for the field was announced, and was completed in time for the 2014 season. The completed Weston Field Athletic Complex allows year round athletic activity for several sports

Chandler Gymnasium
Chandler Gymnasium, a part of the larger Chandler Athletic Center, is the home of Williams's men's and women's basketball teams and women's volleyball team. The gym opened in 1987 and is named for Williams's 12th president, John Wesley Chandler. Prior to Chandler's opening, the basketball and volleyball programs played in Lasell Gymnasium. The gym has a capacity of 1,561 spectators. For the 2010–2011 season, the team ranked 20th in Division III in average game attendance, averaging 876 spectators per home game.

In home games between January 16, 2001, and January 4, 2005, Williams's men's basketball team had a 64-game home unbeaten streak, the current NCAA Division III record.

Lansing Chapman Rink
Lansing Chapman Rink is the home of Williams's men's and women's ice hockey teams and can also be configured for indoor men's and women's tennis. The Williams men's ice hockey team has used the rink since its construction in 1953. Prior to that, the team played on a pond near Cole Field. Despite Lansing Chapman's construction, hockey continued to be an outdoor sport until a canopy was added in 1962. The rink's dimensions are 200 ft. x 85 ft. It has a capacity of 2,500 spectators.

A sound system was added to the rink in 1973. The locker rooms were renovated in 1993, 1995, and 2005.

In addition to Williams athletics, the rink has hosted the figure skating competition of the Winter Bay State Games.

Cole Field
Cole Field, a part of the larger Cole Field athletic complex, is the home of Williams's men's and women's soccer programs. The field includes two regulations soccer pitches to allow the men's and women's teams to play simultaneously. It hosted the 1993 and 1995 Division III men's soccer finals, along with the 1996 Division III women's soccer finals.

Since its opening, the field has received several improvements. An electronic scoreboard was installed for the men's field in 1969 and upgraded in 1993. The women's field received an electronic scoreboard in 1999. In 2005, the men's field had drainage systems installed and was resodded.

Bobby Coombs Field
Prior to the 2005 season, $500,000 Bobby Coombs Field was built as part of the Cole Field Athletic Complex. The field features a permanent outfield fence, dugouts, bullpens, and a drainage system. Its dimensions are 330 ft. down the foul lines, 375 ft. in the gaps, and 400 ft. in center field.

In addition to regular season competition, the field hosts high school baseball showcases.

Renzie Lamb Field
Renzie Lamb Field, the home of the men's and women's lacrosse and women's field hockey programs, is located next to Weston Field. The field, which cost approximately $2 million, was dedicated on October 16, 2004. The field is also used occasionally by the men's and women's soccer programs if Cole Field is unplayable.

Williams Softball Complex
The Williams Softball Complex, part of the larger Cole Field Athletic Complex, features dugouts, bleacher seating, and a permanent fence. In 1998, a new backstop was installed. The playing surface was renovated in 2000 and 2006. Also in 2006, a new outfield fence was installed.

Taconic Golf Club

Taconic Golf Club, the home of the men's and women's golf teams, is located next to campus. The college owns the 18-hole, par 71, 6,808-yard course, which was built in 1927. It has been ranked by Golfweek the 2nd best collegiate course and 83rd best classic course in the world.

It has hosted several major tournaments, including the 1956 U.S. Junior Amateur and the 1963 U.S. Women's Amateur. A marker on the 14th hole commemorates Jack Nicklaus's famous hole-in-one there during the 1956 tournament. It has also hosted the 1958 NCAA Division I Men's Golf Championships, the 1972 NCAA Division II Men's Golf Championships, and the 1999 NCAA Division III Men's Golf Championships.

Torrence M. Hunt Tennis Center
The Torrence M. Hunt Tennis Center, the home of Williams's men's and women's tennis teams, features six tournament courts. Twelve additional courts (four of which are currently tournament-quality) are also used during practices and large tournaments. The Chaffee Tennis House stands at one end of the complex and features a viewing deck for spectators. The venue hosted the 1998 Division III Men's Tennis Championships.

Samuelson-Muir Pool
Samuelson-Muir Pool, part of the Chandler Athletic Complex, is the home of the men's and women's swimming & diving programs. Opened in 1988, it was dedicated in 2000 to Robert B. Muir and Carl R. Samuelson, both former head coaches of the swimming & diving programs. It has a capacity of 400 spectators.

Simon Squash Center
The Simon Squash Center, a part of the Chandler Athletic Complex, features 12 glass-backed squash courts. The center was dedicated in 1998 to the family of William E. Simon, Jr., a Williams alumnus who captained the squash team in his time at the school.

Lasell Gymnasium

Lasell Gymnasium, part of the Chandler Athletic Complex, is the home of the college's men's wrestling program. It was built in 1886 and was the home of the men's and women's basketball teams prior to the 1987 opening of Chandler Gymnasium.

The gymnasium also includes a practice area for the golf team.

Tony Plansky Track
The Tony Plansky Track, used by the men's and women's outdoor track & field programs, rings Weston Field. The 400-meter track was installed in 1987.

Towne Field House
The Towne Field House is the home of the men's and women's indoor track & field programs and also has indoor practice facilities for a number of outdoor sports. It opened in September 1970.

Traditions

Mascot
The origin of the college's mascot, the Purple Cow, is believed to be the following 1895 poem by Frank Gelett Burgess:

I never saw a purple cow
I never hope to see one
But I can tell you anyhow
I'd rather see than be one.

In 1907, Williams students began publishing a humor magazine named the Purple Cow, which credited its name to Burgess' poem. Over the following decades, the mascot gained widespread acceptance.

"Yard by Yard"
The following traditional song was once often sung at Williams sporting events, but its current use is limited.
 Yard by yard we'll fight our way
 Thro' Amherst's line,
 Every man on every play,
 Striving all the time.
 Cheer on cheer will rend the air,
 All behind our men.
 And we'll fight for dear old Williams
 And we'll win and win again.

The Walk
The Walk, which began in 1971, is a post-game tradition of the Williams football team. If Williams wins its homecoming football game, played against either Amherst or Wesleyan, the team walks up Spring Street to St. Pierre's Barber Shop. There, they enjoy cold beverages and cigars and subject underclassmen players to embarrassing haircuts. The Walk was named the best post-game tradition in America by Sports Illustrated in 1992.

Notable alumni

 Josh Bolton, class of 2006, men's soccer; professional soccer player
 John Bray, class of 1900, men's track & field; bronze medalist in the men's 1500 meters at the 1900 Summer Olympics
 Ethan Brooks, class of 1996, football; National Football League player
 Horace Brown, class of 1919, men's track & field; gold medalist in the men's 3000 meters team and individual races at the 1920 Summer Olympics
 Erin Burnett, class of 1998, field hockey and women's lacrosse; CNN journalist and news anchor
 Dan Calichman, class of 1990, men's soccer; United States men's national soccer team player
 Artie Clarke, class of 1889, baseball; Major League Baseball player for the New York Giants
 Dave Clawson, class of 1989, football and men's basketball; Bowling Green State University football coach
 Stephen Danbusky, class of 1999, men's soccer; professional soccer player
 Iron Davis, class of 1912, baseball; Major League Baseball player
 Jim Duquette, class of 1988, baseball; Major League Baseball general manager and broadcaster
 Pat Duquette, class of 1993, basketball; head coach, UMass Lowell.
 Robert F. Engle, class of 1964, men's lacrosse; 2003 laureate of the Nobel Prize in Economics
 Alexander Fetter, class of 1958, men's soccer and men's skiing; Rhodes Scholar and physicist
 Mark Filley, class of 1933, baseball and men's basketball; Major League Baseball player for the Washington Senators
 Robert Leavitt, class of 1907, men's track & field; gold medalist in the men's 110 meter hurdles at the 1906 Summer Olympics
 Edward M. Lewis, class of 1896, baseball; Major League Baseball player and university president
 James Ross MacDonald, class of 1944, men's swimming & diving; Rhodes Scholar and physicist
 Mike Masters, class of 1989, soccer; United States men's national soccer team player
 Jack Mills, class of 1911, baseball; Major League Baseball player
 Kevin Morris, class of 1986, football and baseball; college football coach, currently the offensive coordinator at Yale
 Bill Otis, class of 1912, baseball; Major League Baseball player for the New York Highlanders
 Dave Paulsen, class of 1987, men's basketball; Bucknell University basketball coach
 Barbara Prey, class of 1979, women's tennis and women's squash; Fulbright Scholar and artist
 Charlie Romero, class of 2011, men's soccer; professional soccer player
 Bill Simon, class of 1973, men's squash; businessman and politician, whose family is the namesake of Williams's Simon Squash Center
 George Steinbrenner, class of 1952, football and men's track & field; owner of the New York Yankees
 Hal Steinbrenner, class of 1991, men's track & field; part-owner of the New York Yankees
 Khari Stephenson, class of 2004, men's soccer; professional soccer player, currently with Real Salt Lake
 Faye Sultan, class of 2016, women's swimming & diving; Kuwaiti Olympic swimmer
 Fay Vincent, class of 1960, football and men's track & field; commissioner of Major League Baseball, 1989–1992

References

External links